The Wall That Heals is a 1997 documentary film about the Vietnam Veterans Memorial narrated by Louis Gossett Jr.

External links

Documentary films about the Vietnam War
Documentary films about veterans
1997 films
1997 documentary films
Canadian documentary films
American documentary films
1990s English-language films
Vietnam Veterans Memorial
Films shot in Washington, D.C.
1990s American films
1990s Canadian films